Aleksandr Aleksandrovich Paramonov (born 13 March 1942) is a retired Soviet freestyle swimmer. He competed at the 1964 Summer Olympics in the 400 m freestyle and 4 × 200 m freestyle relay and finished seventh in the latter event. During his career he won four national titles, in the 400 m (1962) and 4 × 100 m freestyle disciplines (1961, 1963 and 1965).

He graduated from the Russian State University of Physical Education in Moscow, and after retirement from competitions worked as a swimming coach and instructor in Moscow. He was awarded the Medal "Veteran of Labour".

References

1942 births
Russian male freestyle swimmers
Olympic swimmers of the Soviet Union
Swimmers at the 1964 Summer Olympics
Living people
Soviet male freestyle swimmers